Buzzard Roost may refer to:

Buzzard Roost, Alabama, an unincorporated community in Colbert County, Alabama, United States
Buzzard Roost Covered Bridge, a historic covered bridge in Colbert County, Alabama, which burned down in 1972
Buzzard Roost Trail, a hiking trail in Southern Indiana, United States; part of the Hoosier National Forest 
Buzzard Roost, the highest point in the South Mountains range of North Carolina, United States
Sprout, Kentucky, an unincorporated community in Nicholas County, Kentucky, United States, formerly known as Buzzard Roost